Segyi may refer to several places in Burma:

 Segyi, Kale
Segyi, Kalewa